United Nations Security Council Resolution 2010 was unanimously adopted on 30 September 2011.

Resolution 
Unanimously adopting resolution 2010 (2011) under Chapter VII of the United Nations Charter, the Council authorize the Member States of the African Union to maintain 
the  deployment  until  31  October  2012  of  AMISOM, and also requested the African Union to “urgently increase” the Mission’s force strength to its mandated level of 12,000 uniformed personnel, and expressed its intention to consider the possible need to adjust that level when AMISOM reached its maximum troop strength.

The Council encouraged the United Nations, by other terms of the text, to work with the 53-member African bloc to develop a guard force, within the Mission’s mandated troop level, to provide security, escort and protection services to international personnel, including United Nations staff.  It further requested the Secretary-General to continue to provide a logistical support package for AMISOM for a maximum of 12,000 uniformed personnel, including the guard force, comprising equipment and services until 31 October 2012, while ensuring accountability and transparency in the expenditure of United Nations funds.

See also 
List of United Nations Security Council Resolutions 2001 to 2100

References

External links
Text of the Resolution at undocs.org

 2010
 2010
2011 in Somalia
September 2011 events